Matt Preston (born 21 July 1961) is an English-Australian food critic, writer and television presenter. He is best known for his role as a judge on Network Ten's MasterChef Australia between 2009 and 2019, and for his weekly national food column that appears in NewsCorp's metro newspapers, with a combined reach of over 2.9 million Australians each week. Preston is also a senior editor for Delicious. and Taste magazines, and is also the author of four best-selling cookbooks.

Career 
Preston is the son of British naval historian and journalist Antony Preston.  He was born in London, United Kingdom, to a Roman Catholic family and from the age of 11 was educated at Worth School, a Benedictine monastic boarding school in West Sussex. He graduated from the University of Kent with a BA Hons in Politics and Government. While growing up in London in the late 1970s, he became a DJ and punk rock musician.

After a few stints working at City Limits and IPC Magazines (TVTimes and What's on TV), Preston relocated to Australia in October 1993. Initially he worked for IPC Magazines as their Australian TV correspondent writing about the soap operas Neighbours and Home and Away for TVTimes, What's on TV and Woman's Own. He subsequently wrote for a number of Australian trade publications owned by IPC's parent company, Reed Business Publishing including Encore, Supermarket News and Counterpoint.

In 1996, Preston started writing reviews for a new Melbourne magazine, Inside Melbourne, a role that he held until he moved on to write reviews for The Age in February 2000.
Preston also worked as a regular food correspondent in a number of publications, including Taste, a supplement in the Herald Sun, The Courier-Mail and The Daily Telegraph (Australia) newspapers and MasterChef Magazine, delicious. (Senior Editor), Australian Good Taste as the drink reviewer, The Guardian newspaper (UK) and Time Out (London). Preston was a weekly contributor to Epicure between 2000 and 2009, writing a weekly review of a cafe or restaurant. He also wrote a weekly column in The Age'''s A2 and was a senior editor at Vogue Entertaining & Travel. Preston has made many appearances on Australian radio.

Today Preston is best known for his stint as a co-host and judge on MasterChef Australia. He also works as a food columnist and regular food correspondent and his weekly national food column appears in NewsCorp's metro newspapers and has a combined reach of over 2.9 million Australians each week. It runs in Stellar magazine every Sunday and in The Adelaide Advertiser. He is also a senior editor for Delicious and Taste magazines.

 MasterChef Australia 
In 2009, Preston joined Gary Mehigan and George Calombaris on the judging panel of MasterChef Australia (Network 10), a reality television competition to find Australia's best amateur chef. MasterChef Australia series two, series three and series eleven would go on to win the TV Week Logie for Australia's Best Reality Series.

Preston would judge the first eleven series of MasterChef Australia (2009–2019), as well as the first season of Celebrity MasterChef Australia (2009), the first series of Junior MasterChef Australia (2010) and MasterChef Australia All-Stars (2012) with Mehigan and Calombaris. In 2013 Preston went it alone to host MasterChef Australia: The Professionals with Marco Pierre White. The show premiered on 20 January 2013 and subsequently won the prestigious AACTA for Best Reality Show in the 2014 awards.

Preston is noted for the colourful suits and cravats he wears on MasterChef. Preston says that his favourite part of MasterChef Australia was "the joy that comes from the contestants delivering us a delicious dish that's a pleasure to eat."

 Other television work 
Preston has also made numerous other appearances on TV shows including multiple appearances on The Project, Good News Week, Studio 10, The Living Room, The Circle, Rove Live, This Week Live, All Star Family Feud and Chris & Julia's Sunday Night Takeaway (all Network 10), ADbc and The Blue List (SBS), Compass (ABC), Today and Postcards (both Nine Network) and Coxy's Big Break (Seven Network). He was also chosen as the secret reviewer in the first season of Channel Seven's My Restaurant Rules. Preston has also taken small acting roles on Offspring (Network 10), Lowdown (ABC), The Bold And The Beautiful (Network 10) and Neighbours (Network 10). Previously, he has appeared on an episode of Lonely Planet Six Degrees.

On 23 October 2019, it was announced that Preston and fellow MasterChef Australia judge Gary Mehigan would join Manu Feildel in 2020 with a new show called Plate of Origin on Seven. In 2022 Preston appeared as a judge on the twelfth season of My Kitchen Rules.

 Vogue Entertaining + Travel and delicious 
Matt has been contributing to Australia's leading glossy food magazines, writing about restaurants, chefs, and leading culinary destinations. The role has taken him to more than 30 regions across Australia and the world.

 Epicure and The Age 
Matt began regularly contributing to the Epicure food section of The Age in February 2000. He wrote a weekly review of a cafe or ethnic eatery in his 'Unexplored' column in Epicure and in 2009 he wrote a weekly column in The Age on Saturday's A2 section. Preston also contributes cover stories to Epicure, for which he has won a number of awards.

 Radio 
In December 2021, ABC announced that Preston will host Saturday Mornings on ABC Radio Melbourne.

 Other professional roles 
 Creative Director, Melbourne Food and Wine Festival (2004–2009).
 Contributor, The Age Good Food Guide; Food and Wine (US).
 Five years as National Chief Judge for Restaurant and Catering's National Awards for Excellence.
 Contributing drink editor, Good Taste magazine.
 Secret reviewer on Seven Network's My Restaurant Rules (series one).
 Judge in The World's Best 50 Restaurants Awards.

 Personal life 
A football fan, Preston supports Chelsea FC and Melbourne Victory. He supports the Collingwood Football Club in the AFL.

His biggest cooking triumphs are: "The national award I've won for my jam recipes and cooking a BBQ for 1,000 people at the Noosa Food and Wine Festival with some volunteers and chef mates. His favourite inspirational cooking quote: "It's not the food on the table, but the eyes across the table that matter" – Robert Castellani, chef at Melbourne's Donovan's restaurant.

 Books Cravat-A-Licious, launched on 1 October 2009. Matt Preston's 100 Best Recipes, launched in 2012 Matt Preston's Fast Fresh and Unbelievably Delicious, launched in 2013 Matt Preston's Cook Book, launched in 2014 Matt Preston's Simple Secrets, launched in 2015, Matt Preston's Yummy Easy Quick, launched in 2017 (Plum/Pan Macmillan)

 Accolades 

Preston has won a number of awards, both individually and as the leader of an organisation, including:

 2003 Food Media Club of Australia Grand Marnier Award for Best New Writer Winner: Matt Preston for articles published in the Epicure section of The Age.
 2004 Food Media Club of Australia Australian Mushroom Growers' Award Best Food Article Winner: Matt Preston for "The Temple Kitchen", Epicure, The Age.
 2006 Food Media Club of Australia Calypso Mango Award for Best Recipe Feature in a Newspaper or Newspaper Magazine Winner: Matt Preston for "Preserving knowledge", Epicure, The Age.
 2008 Le Cordon Bleu World Food Media Awards, Food Journalist of the Year for articles in Delicious Magazine and the Epicure section of The Age.
 2010 The Graham Kennedy Award for Most Outstanding New Talent (Male).
 2011 Nickelodeon Kids Choice Awards Winner – Awesome Oldie.
 Preston appears in Who's Who in Australia'' 2011 edition.

References

External links 

MasterChef
Preston on Nova 100
Preston on the Jono and Dan Show

1961 births
Alumni of the University of Kent
English television presenters
English television personalities
English expatriates in Australia
English food writers
Living people
Logie Award winners
MasterChef Australia
People educated at Worth School
Restaurant critics
Writers from London